Naeil's Cantabile is a South Korean television series adapted from the Japanese manga Nodame Cantabile by Tomoko Ninomiya. Starring Joo Won and Shim Eun-kyung with Park Bo-gum, Go Kyung-pyo and Baek Yoon-sik, it aired on KBS2 from October 13 to December 2, 2014 for 16 episodes.

It was the second co-production between American digital distribution platform DramaFever and a Korean broadcaster after the success of The Heirs in 2013.

Cast

Main
Joo Won as Cha Yoo-jin
Choi Kwon-soo as young Yoo-jin
Shim Eun-kyung as Seol Nae-il
Park Bo-gum as Lee Yoon-hoo
Go Kyung-pyo as Yoo Il-rak
Baek Yoon-sik as Franz Streseman

Supporting

Bae Min-jung as Jung Shi-won
Min Do-hee as Choi Min-hee
Jang Se-hyun as Ma Soo-min
Lee Byung-joon as Do Kang-jae
Kim Yu-mi as Chae Do-kyung
Ye Ji-won as Song Mi-na
Ahn Gil-kang as Yoo Won-sang
Namgung Yeon as Ahn Gun-sung
Lee Joo-hyung as Gu Sun-jae
Baek Seo-bin as Han Seung-oh
Ah Yeon as Son Soo-ji
Cho Yoon-woo as Lee Jae-yong
Jung Sung-ah as Lee Dan-ya
Lee Ah-hyun as Yang Sun-young
Jeong Bo-seok as Cha Dong-woo
Bang Eun-hee as Nae-il's mother
Han Min as Jang Yoo-sung
Kim Ji-han as Im Jae-jung
Moon Hee-kyung as Nae-il's ex teacher
Yoel Levi as Sebastian Viera (cameo, ep 1 & 16)
Sunwoo Jae-duk as Yoo-jin's uncle (cameo)
Kim Ji-sook as Chairwoman (cameo)

Reception
The series suffered from low single-digit ratings and was criticized for its weak narrative development and poor acting performance by Shim Eun-kyung. Despite the low ratings, it recorded viewership share as high as over 25% on Tving, a mobile and internet streaming site for live television.

Ratings

Awards and nominations

International broadcast
It began airing in Japan on Fuji TV in February 2015.
In Thailand aired on PPTV in October 19, 2015.
In Taiwan aired on GTV in November 5, 2015.

References

External links
  
 
 
 

Nodame Cantabile
2014 South Korean television series debuts
Korean Broadcasting System television dramas
South Korean television dramas based on manga
2014 South Korean television series endings
South Korean musical television series
South Korean romantic comedy television series
South Korean LGBT-related television shows
2010s college television series